Härnösand Municipality is a municipality in Västernorrland County, northern Sweden. Its seat is located in Härnösand (pop. 18,000).

The present municipality was formed in 1969 through the amalgamation of the City of Härnösand with Säbrå (itself created in 1952 when five former entities were merged) and Högsjö.

Its coat of arms depict a beaver with a pike in its mouth.

Villages
 Härnösand (seat)
 Ramvik
 Utansjö
 Älandsbro
 Ramsås

References

External links

Härnösand - Official site

 
Municipalities of Västernorrland County